Cape Spencer is an ice-covered point marking on the east the seaward end of the depression occupied by the Ninnis Glacier, located in George V Land. 

It was discovered by the Australasian Antarctic Expedition (1911-14) under Douglas Mawson. He named it in 1911 for Sir Baldwin Spencer, the Director of the National Museum in Melbourne.

References

Spencer, Cape